The Cheyenne Sandstone is an Early Cretaceous geologic formation in Kansas.

See also

 List of fossiliferous stratigraphic units in Kansas
 Paleontology in Kansas

References

Cretaceous Kansas